The following is a List of defunct universities and colleges in Illinois. This list includes accredited, degree-granting institutions and bona fide institutions of higher learning that operated before accreditation existed. All had at least one location within the state of Illinois, and all have since discontinued operations or their operations were taken over by another similar institution of higher learning.

Defunct colleges and universities in Illinois 

 Abingdon College
 American Conservatory of Music
 Argosy University

 Barat College
 Brown's Business College
 Bush Conservatory of Music

 Central YMCA College
 Chicago Conservatory College
 Chicago Technical College
 Curtiss–Wright Aeronautical University

 Dixon College

 Ellis University
 Evanston College for Ladies

 George Williams College (Chicago)
 Gibbs College

 Harrington College of Design
 Harvey Medical College
 Hedding College

 Illinois Institute of Art – Chicago
 Illinois Institute of Art – Schaumburg
 Illinois State University (Springfield, Illinois)
 Illinois Technical College
 International Academy of Design & Technology – Schaumburg
 International Academy of Design and Technology

 Jubilee College, Illinois
 Judson College (Mount Palatine, Illinois)

 La Salle Extension University
 Le Cordon Bleu College of Culinary Arts in Chicago
 Lexington College
 Lincoln College
 Lincoln College of Law
 Lombard College

 Midstate College
 Morthland College
 Mount Morris College
 Mundelein College

 Nauvoo University
 Northwestern College
 Northwestern University Dental School
 Northwestern University Woman's Medical School
 Old University of Chicago

 Robert Morris University Illinois
 Ruskin Colleges
 Sanford-Brown College
 State Community College of East Saint Louis

 St. Viator College
 Shimer Great Books School
 Shurtleff College
 Solex College

 University of Chicago Graduate Library School
 University of Nauvoo

 Vatterott College

 Westfield College (Illinois)
 Westwood College
 William & Vashti College

References 

Illinois education-related lists
Universities and colleges in Illinois